Melat Yisak Kejeta (born 27 September 1992) is a German long-distance runner. She is a silver medalist at the 2020 World Athletics Half Marathon Championships and she represented Germany at the 2020 Summer Olympics in Tokyo, Japan.

Personal life 

Kejeta was born in Ethiopia. She is a member of the Oromo ethnic group, like the Dibaba sisters who are among her role models.
She came to Germany in 2013 as a refugee and acquired German citizenship in March 2019. She lives in Baunatal near Kassel with her husband whom she met in a German regional train.

Career 

She was a talented U20 runner and became good again after having gained a foothold in Germany.
In 2018, she improved her half marathon personal best to 1:08:41, which would have been 3rd place on the 2018 European top list had she already been a German citizen.

In 2019, she made her marathon debut at the 2019 Berlin Marathon held in Berlin, Germany. She had prepared for that in Kenya under the guidance of Eliud Kipchoge's coach Patrick Sang who assessed her marathon potential to be somewhere in the range from 2:19 to 2:22.

Since 6 March 2020, she is eligible to represent Germany in international championships. She made her debut in the German national team in the women's race at the 2020 World Athletics Half Marathon Championships held in Gdynia, Poland. The winner was Peres Jepchirchir of Kenya with 1:05:16 a new world record for a women's only run. Kejeta won silver in 1:05:18. This time was an improvement on her personal best by 3:23, on the German record by 2:40, and on the European record for women-only races by 1:07. Kejeta's split time for the 10 km was 30:47, faster than the German national record for the 10 k. Her performance also helped Germany to win an unexpected team bronze. These were the first German medals ever in a half marathon world championship.

On 7 August 2021, she participated in the marathon of the 2020 Summer Olympics (which had been postponed due to COVID-19) and finished 6th, the best result of a German marathon runner in Olympic Games since Atlanta 1996 when Katrin Dörre-Heinig finished 4th.

Achievements

References

External links 
 

Living people
1992 births
Place of birth missing (living people)
German female long-distance runners
German female marathon runners
Athletes (track and field) at the 2020 Summer Olympics
Olympic athletes of Germany
Olympic female marathon runners
21st-century German women
20th-century German women